Gee, Your Hair Smells Terrific was a popular shampoo manufactured by the Andrew Jergens Company during the 1970s and '80s. The shampoo is noted for its pungent floral fragrance that softened after rinsing and remained in the user's hair for an extended period of time. The shampoo's unique scent has been described as smelling like a  combination of chamomile, bubblegum and sage.

While out of production in the United States since the late 1980s, the formula was licensed to Vibelle Manufacturing Corporation of Malabon, Philippines and is currently sold in the Philippines, where it is still popular.  In the United States, the shampoo is  currently sold by The Vermont Country Store and can be ordered by phone or online.

Pop culture references
The product's unusually long name was satirized on The Simpsons. In one episode, Patty Bouvier waxes her upper lip using a product called "Gee, Your Lip Looks Hairless," and in another episode, a sports venue on the show had been named "The Gee Your Hair Smells Terrific Arena."

It was also mentioned in the season 4 Boy Meets World episode "Fishing for Virna"; when Shawn and his father Chet babysit Frankie's little brother Herman, the latter steals the Hunters' bottle of shampoo, for which he is later made to return it and apologize. After Herman does so, an astounded Chet exclaims "All the valuable things we have in this trailer, and you steal our shampoo?! What kind of weird little thief are you?".

In the 2004 episode of the comedy TV show Will & Grace, Will & Grace & Vince & Nadine (season 7, episode 7), Karen Walker mentions that she has bought Grace a bottle of Gee, Your Hair Smells Terrific.

References

Shampoo brands